Sneak Preview! is the debut album by jazz organist Leon Spencer, Jr. recorded for the Prestige label in 1970.

Reception

The Allmusic site awarded the album 4 stars, stating: "Spencer's swinging solos on these mostly grooving tunes are quite appealing."

Track listing
All compositions by Leon Spencer, Jr. except where noted
 "The Slide" - 6:01  
 "Someday My Prince Will Come" (Frank Churchill, Larry Morey) - 6:30  
 "Message from the Meters" (Leo Nocentelli) - 6:40  
 "First Gravy" - 3:55  
 "5-10-15-20 (25-30 Years of Love)" (Tony Boyd, Archie Powell) - 4:25  
 "Sneak Preview" - 8:00

Personnel
Leon Spencer, Jr. - organ
Virgil Jones - trumpet
Grover Washington, Jr. - tenor saxophone
Melvin Sparks - guitar
Idris Muhammad - drums

Production
 Bob Porter - producer
 Rudy Van Gelder - engineer

References

Leon Spencer albums
1971 debut albums
Prestige Records albums
Albums produced by Bob Porter (record producer)
Albums recorded at Van Gelder Studio